The Thanjavur doll is a type of traditional Indian bobblehead or roly-poly toy made of terracotta material. The centre of gravity and total weight of the doll is concentrated at its bottom-most point, generating a dance-like continuous movement with slow oscillations. These toys are traditionally handmade, finished with detailed, painted exteriors. They have been recognized as a Geographical Indication by the Government of India as of 2008-09.

See also
 Thanjavur painting

References

Tamil art
Traditional dolls
Indian dolls
Thanjavur district
Geographical indications in Tamil Nadu